Richard Van Wagner (October 23, 1936 – March 3, 2007) was an American politician who served in the New Jersey General Assembly from 1974 to 1984 and in the New Jersey Senate from 1984 to 1991.

References

External links

|-

|-

1936 births
2007 deaths
Democratic Party New Jersey state senators
Democratic Party members of the New Jersey General Assembly
People from Middletown Township, New Jersey
Politicians from Monmouth County, New Jersey
20th-century American politicians